This is a list of French television That Maybe related events from 2015.

Events
27 January – Music group Bagad de Vannes win the 9th series of La France a un incroyable talent.
10 March – The Presidential Office confirms that three French sports personalities taking part in the reality television series Dropped  were among 10 people killed in a helicopter crash in Argentina's La Rioja province the previous day. Yachtswoman Florence Arthaud, Olympic swimmer Camille Muffat and Olympic boxer Alexis Vastine were taking part in filming for the series at the time of the crash.
12 March – Emji wins the eleventh series of Nouvelle Star.
8–9 April – Hackers claiming to belong to the militant group Islamic State cause channels operated by TV5Monde to go off-air, and post material on its social media protesting against French military action in Iraq.
25 April - Lilian Renaud wins the fourth series of The Voice: la plus belle voix.
23 October - 14-year-old Jane wins the second series of The Voice Kids.
13 November - Émilie Fiorelli wins the ninth series of Secret Story.
8 December - 19-year-old animal trainer Juliette Roux-Merveille and her dog Charlie win the tenth series of La France a un incroyable talent.
23 December - Singer and runner up of the third series of The Voice Belgique Loïc Nottet and his partner Denitsa Ikonomova win the sixth series of Danse avec les stars.

Debuts

Television shows

1940s
Le Jour du Seigneur (1949–present)

1950s
Présence protestante (1955-)

1970s
30 millions d'amis (1976-2016)

2000s
Nouvelle Star (2003–2010, 2012–present)
Plus belle la vie (2004–present)
La France a un incroyable talent (2006–present)
Secret Story (2007–present)

2010s
Danse avec les stars (2011–present)
The Voice: la plus belle voix (2012–present)

Ending this year

Births

Deaths

See also
2015 in France
List of French films of 2015

References